Even Lovers Get the Blues is a 2016 Belgian drama film written and directed by Laurent Micheli. It explores themes about gender and sexuality, and features a cast of actors in their first major film role. The film had its world premiere at the 2016 Namur International Film Festival, where it received the Critics Prize.

At the 8th Magritte Awards, it received two nominations in the categories of Best First Feature Film and Most Promising Actress for Adriana Da Fonseca.

Accolades

References

External links
 

2016 films
2016 drama films
Belgian drama films
Belgian LGBT-related films
2010s French-language films
Bisexuality-related films
2016 LGBT-related films
LGBT-related drama films